Route 127 is a highway in central Missouri.  Its northern terminus is at U.S. Route 65 west of Malta Bend; its southern terminus is at Route 52 southwest of Sedalia.

Major intersections

References

127
Transportation in Pettis County, Missouri
Transportation in Saline County, Missouri